Wilber Sánchez may refer to:
 Wilber Sánchez (footballer)
 Wilber Sánchez (wrestler)